Artemio Ricarte y García (October 20, 1866 – July 31, 1945) was a Filipino general during the Philippine Revolution and the Philippine–American War. He is regarded as the Father of the Philippine Army, and the first Chief of Staff of the Armed Forces of the Philippines (March 22, 1897- January 22, 1899) though the present Philippine Army descended from the American-allied forces that defeated the Philippine Revolutionary Army led by General Ricarte. Ricarte is notable for never having taken an oath of allegiance to the United States government that occupied the Philippines from 1898 to 1946.

Early life
From the legal union and matrimony of Esteban Ricarte y Faustino with Bonifacia Garcia y Rigonan were born three children: Uno, Artemio and Ylumidad, in the town of Batac, province of Ilocos Norte. Artemio finished his early studies in his hometown and moved to Manila for his tertiary education.  He enrolled at the Colegio de San Juan de Letran graduating with a Bachelor of Arts degree. He prepared for the teaching profession at the University of Santo Tomas and then at the Escuela Normal. After finishing his studies, he was sent to the town of San Francisco de Malabon (now General Trias)  in Cavite province to supervise a primary school.  There, he met Mariano Álvarez, another school teacher and a surviving revolutionary of the 1872 Cavite mutiny. Ricarte joined the ranks of the Katipunan under the Magdiwang Council, where he held the rank of Lieutenant General. He adopted the nom-de-guerre, "Víbora" (Viper).

Philippine Revolution

After the start of the Philippine Revolution on August 31, 1896, Ricarte led the revolutionists in attacking the Spanish garrison in San Francisco de Malabon. He crushed the Spanish troops and took the civil guards as prisoner. On March 22, 1897, during  the Tejeros Convention, Ricarte was unanimously elected Captain-General of a new revolutionary government under Emilio Aguinaldo as president. While he took his oath of office alongside Aguinaldo, he at first joined the Katipunan leader Andres Bonifacio's protests against the legitimacy of this government alongside most other Magdiwang leaders, but he and the others abandoned Bonifacio within a month and he assumed his office in Aguinaldo's government on April 24. Later he received a military promotion to Brigadier-General in Aguinaldo's army. He led his men in various battles in Cavite, Laguna, and Batangas. Aguinaldo designated him to remain in Biak-na-Bato, San Miguel, Bulacan to supervise the surrender of arms such that both the Spanish government and Aguinaldo's officers complied with the terms of the peace pact.

Philippine–American War
 The second phase of the Philippine Revolution was ushered in when the Americans brought back Aguinaldo from exile on May 19, 1898. Ricarte was a minor figure at this stage. He was the rebel commander of Sta. Ana when Manila fell to the Americans on August 13, 1898. With the help of Rear Admiral George Dewey, commander of the American Asiatic Squadron anchored in Manila Bay, and General Wesley Merritt of the American Army, the Filipino troops routed the Spanish command of General Fermin Juadenes. This eventually led General Jaudenes to surrender the City of Manila to Admiral Dewey, thus the liberation of the Philippines from the Spanish colonizers.

General Ricarte was jubilant over the victory, thinking it was the prelude to the attainment of complete Philippine independence. Unfortunately, however, the Americans afterwards refused to recognize the participation of the Filipinos in the siege of the city and even deprived them of their rights as victors to triumphantly enter its gates. The Americans, having gotten rid of the Spaniards with the help of Filipinos, were intent on possessing the Philippines. This development saddened Ricarte, to the extent that later on, he considered another option by which Filipinos could gain their independence.

When the Philippine–American War started in 1899, he was Chief of Operations of the Philippine forces in the third zone around Manila. In July 1900, he tried to infiltrate the American lines to enter Manila but he was captured by the Americans. For six months, he was locked up in the Bilibid Prisons but stubbornly refused to swear allegiance to the United States. Because of this, the Americans exiled him to Guam, together with many of the other rebel prisoners in the islands, termed Irreconcilables by them, including Apolinario Mabini. The exile lasted for two years.

Post-war era
In early 1903, both Ricarte and Mabini would be allowed back into the Philippines upon taking the oath of allegiance to America. Just as the United States Army Transport Thomas pulled into Manila Bay, both were asked to take the oath. Mabini, who was ill, took the oath but Ricarte refused. Ricarte was set free but banned from the Philippines. Without setting foot on Philippine soil, he was placed on the transport Garlic and sailed to Hong Kong.

On December 23, 1903, Ricarte arrived in the Philippines secretly as a stowaway in a freighter, planning to reunite with former members of the army and rekindle the Philippine Revolution. Upon meeting with several former members and friends, he discussed his general plan and the continuation of the revolution. After said meetings, some of these members turned on Ricarte and notified the Americans, specifically former General Pío del Pilar. A reward for US$10,000 was then issued for Ricarte's capture, dead or alive. In the following weeks, Ricarte traveled throughout central Luzon trying to drum up support for his cause.

In early 1904, Ricarte was stricken by an illness that put him at rest for nearly two months. Just as his health was returning, a clerk from his outfit, Luis Baltazar, turned against him and notified the local Philippine Constabulary of his location at Mariveles, Bataan. In May 1904, Ricarte was arrested and spent the next six years at Bilibid Prison. Ricarte was well received and respected by both the Philippine and American authorities. He was frequently visited by old friends from the Philippine revolutionary war as well as U.S. government officials, including the vice-president of the United States under Theodore Roosevelt, Charles W. Fairbanks.

Due to good behavior, Ricarte served only six years of his 11-year sentence. On June 26, 1910, he was released from Bilibid Prison. But upon his exit he was detained by American authorities and taken to the Customs-House in Bagumbayan. He was again ordered to pledge his oath of allegiance to the United States. He still refused to swear allegiance and within the hour of the same day, he was again put on a transport and deported to Hong Kong.

From July 1, 1910 to 1915, Ricarte lived in Hong Kong, first on Lamma Island, at the mouth of the harbor, and, later in Kowloon where he initiated the publication of a fortnightly, "El Grito de Presente" (The Cry of the Present). His name was repeatedly brought to light whenever any manner of uprising occurred in the Philippines. To get away from damaging propaganda, he and his wife, together with his family moved to Tokyo and, later, to Yokohama, Japan, where he lived in self-exile at 149 Yamashita-cho.  While in Japan, Ricarte and his wife, Agueda opened a small restaurant, Karihan Luvimin, and returned to teaching. They chose this name for it is so that Filipino travelers in Japan would know that there were Filipinos living there. Being an educator, Gen. Ricarte taught Spanish language at the Kaigai Shokumin Gakko School in Tokyo. To augment the family income, Agueda sold copies of her husband's book, "Hispano-Philippine Revolution", or Himagsikan nang manga Pilipino Laban sa Kastila (The Revolution of Filipinos Against the Spaniards) was published in Yokohama in 1927. It became very saleable to Filipinos on board ship. Agueda Esteban, his wife engaged in the real estate business, which enabled the couple to purchase three houses in Japan.

In all the years they stayed in Japan, Ricarte's dream of an independent Philippines never waned. Every year, he never failed to celebrate Rizal Day and Bonifacio Day by hosting big affairs with Filipino residents and Japanese officials.

Wartime and Ricarte's return to the Philippines

Just as Ricarte's life was fading away into obscurity, World War II began and Imperial Japanese Army invaded the Philippines.  In 1942, when Japan's military forces occupied Manila, Prime Minister Tojo asked Ricarte to return to the Philippines to help maintain peace and order. He agreed and requested Tojo to give Philippines its genuine independence from the American colonial rule. Tojo thus promised Ricarte that if he could bring about peace and order in the Philippines within a year, the Japanese government would hand back to the Filipino people their independence. As he had always aspired to see a free Philippines, Ricarte accepted the offer. Under this agreement, he gained the respect of the Japanese and Filipino nationalists like Emilio Aguinaldo. In 1943, Japan nominally granted the Philippines independence with the establishment of the Second Philippine Republic, formally known as the "Republic of the Philippines", which in actuality was a puppet state of Japan.

Ricarte and Benigno Ramos

Sometime in November 1944, Gen. Artemio Ricarte informed his wife, Agueda that President Laurel and his cabinet would have a meeting in Baguio with high-ranking Japanese officials and that he had to be present there. He would tell her further that in case he had to stay longer in Baguio, he would send for his family to join him.

Before he left Baguio, Benigno Ramos, the leader-founder of MAKAPILI, invited him over to his place (where the Christ the King building in Quezon City is now located). He went there together with his granddaughter Ma. Luisa D. Fleetwood. While they were having their lunch, Ramos asked him to sign up as a member of the Makapili Organization. Gen. Ricarte, refused. He told Ramos that he did not have to sign up with the said organization in order to prove his patriotism and loyalty to his people. He added that he was already physically frail and could not carry out large tasks anymore. However, he gave the approval and blessing to establish the organization to counter the impending American invasion.

Death

Near the end of World War II, Ricarte again found himself taking flight from American and Filipino forces. Ricarte was implored by colleagues to evacuate the Philippine Islands but had refused, stating "I can not take refuge in Japan at this critical moment when my people are in actual distress. I will stay in my Motherland to the last."

In April 1945, the Battle of Bessang Pass was midway. It had started in January of that year, when Filipino forces under the Philippine Commonwealth Army, Philippine Constabulary, and USAFIP-NL military units were situated in the foothills of Tagudin, Ilocos Sur in pursuit of the Japanese General Tomoyuki Yamashita, the "Tiger of Malaya" and his forces, which Ricarte had joined. In May, there was a lull in the fighting, as casualties mounted on both sides from the armed conflict, but worsened by malaria, cholera and dysentery. In June, Yamashita's army found themselves surrounded on all sides and Bessang Pass fell on June 14, 1945. Ricarte had fallen ill and suffered from debilitating dysentery at Kalinga, Mountain Province, Ricarte died on July 31, 1945, at the age of 78. His grave was discovered nine years later in 1954 by treasure hunters. Ricarte's body was exhumed and his tomb now lies in Manila at the Libingan ng mga Bayani. Furthermore, a landmark was inaugurated by historian Ambeth Ocampo, chairman of the National Historical Institute with a granddaughter of Artemio Ricarte, in April 2002, at the same place where the general died.

Memorials

 In 1972, a monument was erected at Yamashita Park in Yokohama, Japan.
 The birth house of Artemio Ricarte is now the Ricarte National Shrine and Museum in Batac, Ilocos Norte, Philippines.
 For battles and deeds accomplished in Cavite, a marker was placed at Poblacion, General Trias, Cavite for General Artemio Ricarte.

In popular culture
 Portrayed by Vic Vargas in the 1972 film El Vibora, one of Ishmael Bernal’s early works.
 Portrayed by Pen Medina in the 1992 film, Bayani.
 Portrayed by Ian de Leon in the 2012 film, El Presidente.
 Portrayed by Justin Candado II in the 2013 GMA TV Series, Katipunan.
 Portrayed by Jack Love Falcis in the 2014 film, Bonifacio: Ang Unang Pangulo.

Notes

References

9. Ricarte, Artemio (Vibora)  The Hispano-Philippine Revolution. Yokohama, Japan, 1926. 99.p

Sources

1866 births
1945 deaths
People from Batac
People of the Philippine Revolution
People of the Philippine–American War
Paramilitary Filipinos
Filipino generals
Filipino expatriates in Japan
Filipino collaborators with Imperial Japan
Colegio de San Juan de Letran alumni
Chairmen of the Joint Chiefs (Philippines)
Philippine Army
Filipino exiles
Burials at the Libingan ng mga Bayani
University of Santo Tomas alumni
Aguinaldo administration personnel